Jalan Chuping, Federal Route 1002, is a federal road in Perlis, Malaysia.

At most sections, the Federal Route 1002 was built under the JKR R5 road standard, with a speed limit of 90 km/h.

List of junctions

Malaysian Federal Roads
Roads in Perlis